Gilles Lebeau is a French mathematician born on 17 November 1954, professor at the University of Nice Sophia-Antipolis (since 2001), member of the Institut universitaire de France (since 2003) and member of the Académie des sciences (since 2005).

School career and teaching 
Gilles Lebeau is a former student of the École normale supérieure (ENS) de la rue d'Ulm (class of S1974). Lebeau studied from 1974 to 1978 at the ENS with agrégation in 1976. There he graduated in 1978 with Thèse de troisième cycle and in 1983 with Thèse d'État under the supervision of Louis Boutet de Monvel. Lebeau has been a professor at the University of Orsay and at the École Polytechnique.

Scientific awards and honours 

 BM France Award (1988)
 Invited speaker at the International Congress of Mathematicians in Kyoto (1990)
 Silver medal of the CNRS (1992)
 Servant Prize of the Academy of Sciences (1992)
 Junior member of the Institut universitaire de France (1992–1997)
 Ampère Prize (Grand Prize of the Academy of Sciences) (2003)

References

External links 

 Mathematics Genealogy Project 
 Curriculum Vitæ sur le site de l'Académie des Sciences.

École Normale Supérieure alumni
1954 births
Living people
Academic staff of Côte d'Azur University
Academic staff of École Polytechnique
Nicolas Bourbaki
Members of the French Academy of Sciences
21st-century French mathematicians
20th-century French mathematicians